Coffee Tycoon is a business simulation game developed by Jamopolis Interactive, published by Reflexive Arcade, and released in 2005.  The game involves managing a coffee business by buying new stores, recipes & advertisements.

References

External links 
 Jamopolis Games official website

2005 video games
Business simulation games
Windows games
Windows-only games